The 2001 Dwars door Vlaanderen was the 56th edition of the Dwars door Vlaanderen cycle race and was held on 28 March 2001. The race started in Kortrijk and finished in Waregem. The race was won by Niko Eeckhout.

General classification

References

2001
2001 in road cycling
2001 in Belgian sport
March 2001 sports events in Europe